The Dallas Cowboys Cheerleaders (sometimes initialized as DCC, and officially nicknamed "America's Sweethearts") are the National Football League cheerleading squad representing the Dallas Cowboys team.

History

1960s
During a game between the Cowboys and the Atlanta Falcons at the Cotton Bowl during the 1967 season, the short skirted, well-endowed stripper named Bubbles Cash caused a tremendous stir in the crowd that turned to cheers when she walked down the stands staircase on the 50-yard line carrying cotton candy in each hand. She became an instant public sensation in Dallas, also gaining attention from Cowboys General Manager Tex Schramm. Understanding the importance of the entertainment industry to the Cowboys' profitability, Schramm was inspired to form a cheerleading squad dressed in similar fashion to Cash.

1970s
Preparing for the 1970 season, Schramm decided to change the Cheerleaders' image to boost attendance. At first the main change was to create an all-female squad and change the uniforms and style of cheerleading routines to be primarily dance and less like traditional acrobatic routines like that of high school or college cheerleading squads. The ten local high school cheerleaders who were selected for the 1970 season were also involved in the task of totally redesigning the uniforms and creating new dance style cheer routines under Dee Brock's direction and with the help of a choreographer. In 1971, the qualification rules changed to allow not only local female cheerleaders to compete for a spot on the squad, but also high school drill team officers. Then in 1972, Texie Waterman, a New York choreographer, was recruited and assigned to auditioning and training an entirely new female squad who would all be over 18 years of age, searching for attractive appearance, athletic ability, and raw talent as performers. Since the 1972 squad consisted of adults, this allowed the possibility of again redesigning the uniforms to introduce a more revealing look (most notably transitioning from the traditional cheerleader skirt to hot pants) closer to the classic DCC image that is known today.

Even greater national attention came in the fall of 1977 when the Cowboys, along with designer and photographer Bob Shaw, produced the first NFL cheerleader poster for the Dallas Cowboys. This, and an Esquire magazine article by Shaw in October 1977, led to the squad appearing on two network TV specials, NBC Rock-n-Roll Sports Classic and The Osmond Brothers Special on ABC. Also that year, the DCC produced their own one-hour special, The 36 Most Beautiful Girls in Texas, which aired on ABC prior to the season opener of Monday Night Football (which coincidentally was a game that the Cowboys hosted). On 14 January, 1979, the made-for-TV movie The Dallas Cowboys Cheerleaders aired. Starring Bert Convy and Jane Seymour, it had a 48% share of the national television audience.

1980s 

On 13 January, 1980, a sequel to the original TV movie, The Dallas Cowboys Cheerleaders II, aired. The Cheerleaders have made many other TV appearances since then, and their likeness has been featured on various merchandise, such as posters, T-shirts, trading cards, and calendars.

The DCC has also toured throughout the United States (on and off the field), as well as overseas. Included in these tours are regular appearances in United Service Organizations (USO) tours, which began during the 1979 holiday season for U.S. troops stationed in South Korea.

1990s 

The DCC held a ceremony inaugurating the second game of the 1994 FIFA World Cup between Spain and South Korea.

Former DCCs Kelli McGonagill Finglass and Judy Trammell became the squad's director and choreographer, respectively.

2000s – present 

From 2006-2021, the Cheerleaders  produced their own reality television series, Dallas Cowboys Cheerleaders: Making the Team, which aired on Country Music Television (CMT) during the NFL football season. The series followed the auditioning process of the annual squad. Traditionally, each episode would include segments of the “Training Camp Candidates” and “Veteran Candidates” dancing along to music and learning new choreography from guest choreographers. Despite the show running successfully for 16 seasons, CMT decided to not renew the show for its 17th season and the cheerleaders have since been looking for a new network. 

The DCC also held an opening ceremony and podium at the 2013 and 2018 United States Grand Prix races in Austin, Texas. They received the FIFA delegation to promote the 2022 FIFA World Cup.

The DCC releases several calendars every year. More recently, in addition to their annual swimsuit calendar, they also release an annual "sideline calendar," featuring photos of the DCC cheering and performing at Cowboys home games. For decades the DCC have become advocates for female empowerment in the DFW metroplex.

The DCC were the subject of the documentary Daughters of the Sexual Revolution: The Untold Story of the Dallas Cowboys Cheerleaders released in November 2018. It focuses on Suzanne Mitchell who was the director of the team from 1972 to 1989.

In December 2021, the magazine Texas Monthly released an 8-episode podcast called "America's Girls," featuring interviews with former cheerleaders and other people involved with the DCC.

Off-field television appearances
Along with their two TV movies, the DCC has also appeared on numerous TV shows and specials as performers, guest acting roles, and game show contestants. Some of the shows on which they have appeared include:
 The Love Boat, Episodes #62 and #63 (Season 3) and #84 (Season 4)
 WrestleMania 38

In fiction
 Debbie Does Dallas is a fictionalized (and pornographic) account of a group of teenagers' efforts to join a thinly veiled version of the squad. Porn star Bambi Woods (who played the title role) had actually auditioned for the real-life DCC but didn't make the squad. The DCC objected to the producer's imitation use of their uniform (which is a DCC trademark) and were able to secure injunctions to block theaters from showing the film.

DCC alumni
Many former DCCs have gone on to achieve success in show business and other notable endeavors.  They include:
 Melissa Rycroft, (2006-08), winner of The Bachelor (Season 13); second-runner up on Dancing with the Stars (Season 8); winner of Dancing with the Stars (All-Stars);
 Jenni Croft (2002–05), runner-up on The Bachelor (Season 11); former Miami Heat cheerleader; former Phoenix Suns cheerleader
 Sarah Shahi (1999–2000), actress; USA Network's Fairly Legal and CBS's Person of Interest\]]{}#%>£££]][___apple—/)?2$&&1199

Gallery

References

Sources
 Shropshire, Mike. (1997). The Ice Bowl. New York, NY: Donald I. Fine Books. 

External links
 
 
 "America's Girls" podcast from Texas Monthly''

1960 establishments in Texas
culture of Dallas
Dallas Cowboys
National Football League cheerleading squads
performing groups established in 1960
History of women in Texas
Women in Dallas